Diahouin is a village in western Ivory Coast. It is in the sub-prefecture of Duékoué, Duékoué Department, Guémon Region, Montagnes District.

Diahouin was a commune until March 2012, when it became one of 1126 communes nationwide that were abolished.

Notes

Former communes of Ivory Coast
Populated places in Montagnes District
Populated places in Guémon